Nod to the Old School  is a compilation album by the American heavy metal band Armored Saint. It was released in 2001 on Metal Blade Records. The album features some new tracks ("Real Swagger" and "Unstable"), live versions of two Revelation album tracks, the entire 1983 demo plus other rarities from their past.

Track listing

Personnel

Band

John Bush – vocals
Phil Sandoval – lead and rhythm guitar
Dave Prichard – lead guitar
Jeff Duncan –lead and rhythm guitar
Joey Vera – bass
Gonzo Sandoval – drums

Production
Bill Metroyer – producer, engineer
Joey Vera – producer, mixing
Armored Saint – producer 
Brian Foraker – producer 
Timothy Powell – engineer 
Steve Hall – mastering
Brian J. Ames – design
Al Perez – photography
Alex Solca – cover art, photography

References

External links 

Official Armored Saint Site
[ Armored Saint on Allmusic Guide]
Armored Saint's Nod to the Old School on Encyclopaedia Metallum

2001 compilation albums
Armored Saint albums
Metal Blade Records compilation albums